Carroll Miller became Chairman of Interstate Commerce Commission in 1936.

Life and career 
Carroll Miller was born in Richmond, Virginia and lived in Pennsylvania. He was appointed a member of the Interstate Commerce Commission by President Theodore Roosevelt in 1933. This appointment might have been based on a recommendation by the president's political ally Senator Joseph F. Guffey of Pennsylvania, the brother-in-law of Carroll Miller, as he had practically no knowledge of railroads and railroad employees. He was serious and hard-working and became Chairman of Interstate Commerce Commission on 29 December 1936.

References 

People of the Interstate Commerce Commission
Politicians from Richmond, Virginia